Valbona Sako served as a former mayor of Durrës, Albania from July 2019 until 1 December 2019 when she resigned from her post.

Politics
Durrës is a municipality governed by a mayor–council system with the mayor of Durrës and the members of the Durrës Municipal Council being responsible for the administration of Durrës Municipality.

Record of earthquakes
Since antiquity, earthquakes in Durrës and the surrounding regions have disrupted everyday living. The first recorded event occurred somewhat later in the 4th century. In c. 1273, it was wrecked by a devastating earthquake (according to George Pachymeres) but soon recovered. An earthquake in 1926 damaged some of the city and the rebuilding that followed gave the city its more modern appearance. On 26 November 2019, a 6.4-magnitude earthquake struck Albania, killing 51.

See also
Vangjush Dako, previous Mayor
Politics of Albania
2019 in Albania

References

Living people
21st-century Albanian women politicians
21st-century Albanian politicians
Mayors of Durrës
Mayors of places in Albania
Year of birth missing (living people)